William Torrens McCullagh Torrens (13 October 1813 – 26 April 1894) was an Irish Liberal politician, who sat in the House of Commons for English constituencies variously between 1848 and 1885.

Torrens was the son of James McCullagh of Greenfield, Dublin, and his wife Jane Torrens, daughter of Andrew Torrens of Dublin. He was educated at Trinity College, Dublin. In 1835 he was Assistant Commissioner of the Irish Poor Inquiry and was called to the bar in Ireland in 1836. He was an original member of the Anti-Corn Law League founded in 1838. In 1846 he was private secretary to Henry Labouchere when he was Chief Secretary for Ireland.

Torrens stood for parliament unsuccessfully at  Dundalk in 1847 but was seated as Member of Parliament  on petition in March 1848. He held the seat until 1852 when he stood unsuccessfully for Yarmouth.

Torrens was called to the bar at Lincoln's Inn in 1855. He was elected MP for Yarmouth in 1857 but his election was declared void on petition. In 1863 he adopted the additional surname Torrens.  In 1865 he was elected MP for Finsbury. He held the seat until 1885. He introduced in 1866 the "Artisans and Labourers Dwelling Bill" and carried the lodger franchise in the Reform Act 1867. He obtained a Select Committee on Extradition in 1869  and in 1874 brought  in and carried the Building Societies Bill.

Torrens published a number of works including 
Lectures on the Use and Study of History
Life of Lord Melbourne
Industrial History of Free Nations
Empire in Asia
Memoirs of Wellesley

Torrens died at the age of 80 after being knocked down by a hansom cab.

Torrens married firstly Margaret Henrietta Gray daughter of John Gray of Claremorris, County Mayo in 1836. She died in 1873 and he married secondly Emily Harrison, daughter of William Harrison of Leamington in 1878.

References

External links 

 
 

1813 births
1894 deaths
Members of the Parliament of the United Kingdom for County Louth constituencies (1801–1922)
UK MPs 1847–1852
Members of the Parliament of the United Kingdom for English constituencies
UK MPs 1857–1859
UK MPs 1865–1868
UK MPs 1868–1874
UK MPs 1874–1880
UK MPs 1880–1885
Alumni of Trinity College Dublin
Members of Lincoln's Inn
Politics of the Borough of Great Yarmouth
Members of the London School Board